Vision is the name of three fictional characters from Marvel Comics.  The original character originated in Marvel's predecessor Timely Comics and is depicted as an extra-dimensional law enforcement officer; the latter two are humanoid androids. The original first appeared in Marvel Mystery Comics #13 in 1940.

Vision (Aarkus)

The original Vision first appeared in Marvel Mystery Comics #13 by Timely Comics by Joe Simon and Jack Kirby.

Vision (Victor Shade)
 
A character loosely based on the original, the Vision was created in 1968 by Roy Thomas, Stan Lee and John Buscema. He's the best-known version, having made several appearances in the Marvel Cinematic Universe movies and TV shows beginning in the 2010s.

Vision (Jonas)

The Vision (Jonas) is a fictional superhero appearing in American comic books published by Marvel Comics. The character first appears in Young Avengers #5, and is the third character and second android character published by Marvel with the superhero name Vision. He is a combination of the original android Vision's program files and the armor and brain patterns of Iron Lad.

Publication history
Vision first appeared in Young Avengers #5 (August 2005) and was created by Allan Heinberg and Jim Cheung.
 
The exact details of the character's personality and mental make-up vary from writer to writer. While some writers, such as Heinberg and Dan Slott, write him as an entirely new character, other writers like Brian Michael Bendis (during the "Collective" storyline) and Ed Brubaker (in Captain America: Reborn) write him as if he is the original Vision in a new body (or at least has access to the original Vision's memories).

Fictional character biography
The Vision is a fusion of the old Vision's operating systems and the armor of adventurer Iron Lad, a teenage version of Kang the Conqueror who arrives in the present. Through this merger, Iron Lad is able to access plans the Vision had created in the event of the Avengers' defeat. He uses these plans to assemble a new team of "Young Avengers". When Iron Lad is forced to remove his armor to stop Kang the Conqueror from tracking him, the Vision's operating system causes the armor to become a sentient being. When Iron Lad leaves the time period, he leaves the armor behind with the Vision's operating system activated.

The new Vision opts to stay with the Young Avengers and serve as a mentor for them, though it is later revealed that (due to having Iron Lad's brainwave patterns as the basis for his personality) he is with the group due to his growing feelings of affection towards Cassie Lang, the superhero known as Stature. After the events of the "Civil War" storyline, the Vision travels the world posing as different people in order to gain a better understanding of who he is. He then finds Cassie and declares his love, and states he has adopted the name "Jonas". During a later battle between the alien Skrulls and the Avengers, the Vision is shot through the head. He survives and joins with Nick Fury and S.H.I.E.L.D. alongside the other Young Avengers.

He joins the new lineup of the Mighty Avengers, along with Stature. They opt to keep their dual memberships in the Avengers and the Young Avengers a secret, in order to hunt for the Scarlet Witch (really Loki in disguise), who arranged for the roster to form. They ultimately tell their teammates this when Loki reveals his impersonation of Wanda and confront him. When Steve Rogers was sent travelling back and forth across his timeline, he is able to pass on a message to the Avengers in the present by briefly isolating himself with the Vision during the Kree-Skrull War and asking him to pass on a time-delayed message, which Jonas was able to access and share with the other Avengers. When the Mighty Avengers ultimately disbands following the events of the "Siege", Jonas and Cassie rejoin the Young Avengers full-time.

In Avengers: Children's Crusade, Cassie is killed by Doctor Doom, and Iron Lad decides to take her body into the future to be revived. Jonas protests, reasoning that such an action is more in line with Kang's manipulation of time than what Cassie would want, and Iron Lad murders him in a fit of jealous anger. Although his teammates contemplate rebuilding him, they decide against it, both because they lack the 30th-century technology to do so and because, even with their access to his back-ups, the lack of a back-up immediately prior to his death would mean that they would have to tell him about Cassie's death all over again. Kate, Cassie's best friend, prefers to believe that he and Cassie are somehow together wherever they are now.

Powers and abilities
Vision is able to use Iron Lad's neuro-kinetic armor to recreate the former Vision's abilities, including superhuman strength, density manipulation, and flight. The yellow solar cell on his forehead can also emit a beam of infrared and microwave radiation. He is also capable of energy and holographic manipulation, shapeshifting and time travel.

References

Articles about multiple fictional characters
Marvel Comics code names
Characters created by Allan Heinberg
Marvel Comics male superheroes